Events from the year 1952 in the United States of America.

Incumbents

Federal Government 
 President: Harry S. Truman (D-Missouri)
 Vice President: Alben W. Barkley (D-Kentucky)
 Chief Justice: Fred M. Vinson (Kentucky)
 Speaker of the House of Representatives: Sam Rayburn (D-Texas)
 Senate Majority Leader: Ernest McFarland (D-Arizona)
 Congress: 82nd

Events

January
 January 14 – The Today Show premieres on NBC, becoming one of the longest-running television series in America.

February
 February 2 – Groundhog Day tropical storm forms just north of Cuba, moving northeast. The storm makes landfall in southern Florida the next day as a gale-force storm and transitions to a tropical storm over the Atlantic (only Atlantic tropical storm on record in February).
 February 6 – A mechanical heart is used for the first time in a human patient.
 February 20 – Emmett Ashford becomes the first African-American umpire in organized baseball, by being authorized to be a substitute umpire in the Southwestern International League.

March
 March 20
 The United States Senate ratifies a peace treaty with Japan.
 The 24th Academy Awards ceremony, hosted by Danny Kaye, is held at RKO Pantages Theatre in Hollywood, Los Angeles. Vincente Minnelli's An American in Paris and George Stevens' A Place in the Sun both win a respective six awards each, the former winning Best Motion Picture and the latter winning Best Director for Stevens. Elia Kazan's A Streetcar Named Desire receives the most nominations with 12.
 March 21 – Tornadoes ravage the lower Mississippi River Valley, leaving 208 dead, through March 22.
 March 22 – Wernher von Braun publishes the first in his series of articles entitled Man Will Conquer Space Soon!, including ideas for manned flights to Mars and the Moon.
 March 29 – U.S. President Harry S. Truman announces that he will not seek reelection.

April
 April 8 – Youngstown Sheet & Tube Co. v. Sawyer: The U.S. Supreme Court limits the power of the President to seize private business, after President Harry S. Truman nationalizes all steel mills in the United States, just before the 1952 steel strike begins.
 April 15 – The United States B-52 Stratofortress flies for the first time.
 April 23 – A nuclear test is held in the Nevada desert.
 April 28 – The Treaty of San Francisco goes into effect, formally ending the occupation of Japan.
 April 29 – Lever House officially opens in New York City, heralding a new age of commercial architecture in the United States.

May
 May 3 – U.S. lieutenant colonels Joseph O. Fletcher and William P. Benedict land a plane at the geographic North Pole.

June
 June 14 – The keel is laid for the U.S. nuclear submarine USS Nautilus.
 June 19 – The United States Army Special Forces is created.

July
 July 3 – The ocean liner SS United States makes her maiden crossing of the Atlantic.
 July 19–26 – Washington D.C. UFO incident.  Several alleged UFOs tracked on multiple radars. Jets scramble on several occasions and the objects take evasive action, only to return after the jets leave the area.
 July 21 – The 7.3  Kern County earthquake strikes Southern California with a maximum Mercalli intensity of XI (Extreme), killing 12 and injuring hundreds.
 July 25 – Puerto Rico becomes a self-governing commonwealth of the United States.

August
 August 22 – A 5.8  aftershock affects Bakersfield with a maximum Mercalli intensity of VIII (Severe), killing two and causing an additional $10 million in damage.
 August 23 – Kitty Wells becomes the first woman to score a number 1 hit on the American country charts, with the song "It Wasn't God Who Made Honky Tonk Angels".
 August 29 –  John Cage's 4' 33" premieres in Woodstock, New York.

September

 September 2 – Dr. C. Walton Lillehei and Dr. F. John Lewis perform the first open-heart surgery at the University of Minnesota.
 September 19 – The United States bars Charlie Chaplin from re-entering the country, after a trip to the UK.
 September 23 – Republican vice presidential candidate Richard Nixon gives his Checkers speech.

October
 October 7 – The New York Yankees defeat the Brooklyn Dodgers, 4 games to 3, to win their 15th World Series Title.
 October 12 – The Gamma Sigma Sigma National Service Sorority is founded in New York City at Panhellenic Tower.
 October 14 – The United Nations begins work in the new headquarters of the United Nations in New York City.
 October 16 – Limelight opens in London; writer/actor/director/producer Charlie Chaplin arrives by ocean liner; in transit his re-entry permit to the USA is revoked by J. Edgar Hoover.

November

 November 1 – Nuclear testing: Operation Ivy: The United States successfully detonates the first hydrogen bomb, codenamed "Mike", at Eniwetok Atoll in the Marshall Islands in the central Pacific Ocean, with a yield of 10.4 megatons.
 November 4 
1952 United States presidential election: Republican candidate Dwight D. Eisenhower defeats Democratic Governor of Illinois Adlai Stevenson (correctly predicted by the UNIVAC computer). The Constitution Party nominates candidates.
The U.S. National Security Agency is founded.
 November 20 – The first official passenger flight over the North Pole is made from Los Angeles to Copenhagen.
 November 29 – Korean War: U.S. President-elect Dwight D. Eisenhower fulfills a political campaign promise, by traveling to Korea to find out what can be done to end the conflict.
 November – Publication of Web of Evil comic book begins.

December
 December 1 – The New York Daily News carries a front-page story announcing that Christine Jorgensen, a transsexual woman in Denmark, has become the recipient of the first successful sexual reassignment operation.
 December 14 – The first successful surgical separation of Siamese twins is conducted in Mount Sinai Hospital, Cleveland, Ohio.
 December 20 – The crash of a U.S. Air Force C-124 Globemaster at Moses Lake, Washington kills 86 servicemen.

Undated
 Nearly 58,000 cases of polio are reported in the U.S.; 3,145 die and 21,269 are left with mild to disabling paralysis.
 The National Prohibition Foundation is incorporated in Indiana.
 The American Embassy School of New Delhi is founded.
 13-year-old Jimmy Boyd's record of I Saw Mommy Kissing Santa Claus is released, selling 3 million records.

Ongoing
 Cold War (1947–1991)
 Second Red Scare (1947–1957)
 Korean War (1950–1953)

Births

January
 January 2 
 Shirley Fulton, African-American prosecutor and judge (died 2023)
 Wendy Phillips, actress
 January 3 – Jim Ross, wrestling announcer
 January 6 – Moondog Spot, wrestler (died 2003)
 January 8 – Mel Reynolds, academic and politician
 January 9 – Mike Capuano, lawyer and politician
 January 12
 Charles Faulkner, life coach, motivational speaker, trader and author
 Walter Mosley, author
 January 14 – Maureen Dowd, journalist
 January 16
 L. Blaine Hammond, colonel, pilot and astronaut
 Julie Anne Peters, engineer and author
 January 19
 Beau Weaver, voice actor
 Bruce Jay Nelson, computer scientist (died 1999)
 January 20 
 Dave Fennoy, African-American voice actor
 Paul Stanley, co-founder of hard rock band KIϟϟ 
 January 21 – Louis Menand, writer and critic
 January 23 – Shelby Jordan, American football player (died 2022)
 January 27 – Brian Gottfried, tennis player
 January 28 – Bruce Helford, television writer and producer
 January 30 – Steve Bartek, guitarist and composer

February
 February 1 – Stan Kasten, baseball executive, President of the Washington Nationals
 February 2 – John Cornyn, U.S. Senator from Texas from 2002
 February 5 – Mark Fuhrman, police detective, author and radio host
 February 14 – Nancy Keenan, president of NARAL
 February 16 – James Ingram, R&B singer-songwriter, record producer and instrumentalist (died 2019)
 February 22
Robert Bauer, attorney
Albert Bryant, Jr., general
Cyrinda Foxe, model and actress (died 2002)
Bill Frist, U.S. Senator from Tennessee from 1995 to 2007
Wayne Levi, golfer
 February 24 – Maxine Chernoff, poet, novelist and editor
 February 29
 Gary the Retard, member of The Wack Pack (The Howard Stern Show)
 Sharon Dahlonega Raiford Bush, first female African-American primetime weather anchor

March 

 March 2 – Laraine Newman, actress and comedian
 March 4 – Ronn Moss, actor 
 March5 – Robin Hobb, writer 
 March 8 – George Allen, U.S. Senator from Virginia from 2001 to 2007
 March 22 – Bob Costas, sportscaster
 March 23 – Rex Tillerson, 69th United States Secretary of State, CEO of ExxonMobil
 March 25 – Billy "Harp" Hamilton, singer, songwriter, harmonica-guitar player
 March 27 – Jim Bolla,  basketball coach (died 2022)
 March 31
Vanessa del Rio, actress 
Frank De Martini, architect (died 2001)

April
 April 1 – Rey Robinson, sprinter and coach
 April 5 – Mitch Pileggi, actor 
 April 12 – Ralph Wiley, sports journalist (died 2004)  
 April 15
 Glenn Shadix, actor (died 2010) 
 Sam McMurray, actor 
 April 16  
 Bill Belichick, American football coach  
David Hann, politician
Billy West, voice actor 
 April 22 – Marilyn Chambers, porn actress (Behind the Green Door) (died 2009)  
 April 25 – Lane Caudell, actor 
 April 26 – Spice Williams-Crosby, actress and stunt performer  
 April 28 – Mary McDonnell, actress
 April 29 – Dave Valentin, Latin jazz flautist (died 2017)

May
 May 2 – Christine Baranski, actress
 May 6
 Gregg Henry, actor and musician  
 Michael O'Hare, actor (died 2012)
 May 8 – Ronnie Dapo, child actor  
 May 11
Warren Littlefield, businessman
Mike Lupica, sports journalist
 May 13 – John Kasich, Governor of Ohio
 May 18
 Diane Duane, writer
 George Strait, country musician  
 May 21 – Mr. T, actor
 May 25 – Gordon H. Smith, U.S. Senator from Oregon from 1997 to 2009
 May 26 – David Meece, singer-songwriter and pianist 
 May 28 – Victoria Cunningham, actress, Playboy Playmate

June
 June 3 – Billy Powell, keyboard player and songwriter (died 2009)
 June 4 – Scott Wesley Brown, Christian musician
 June 6 – Marsha Blackburn, politician
 June 8 – Dave Jennings, American football player and sportscaster (died 2013)
 June 12 – Spencer Abraham, U.S. Senator from Michigan from 1995 to 2001
 June 14
 Pat Summitt, basketball player and coach (died 2016)
 Leon Wieseltier, philosopher, journalist, and critic 
 June 17 – Mike Milbury, ice hockey player, coach and executive
 June 18
 Carol Kane, actress 
 Miriam Flynn, actress
 June 19 – Jim Johnston, composer and musician
 June 20 – John Goodman, actor
 June 21
 Dave Downs, baseball player
 Marcella Detroit, singer (Shakespears Sister)
 June 23 
 Marv Kellum, American football player
 Phil Saviano, sexual abuse activist (died 2021)
 June 25 – Leonard Lance, politician
 June 26
 Michele McDonald, nurse, model and beauty pageant titleholder (died 2020)
 William Arthur Pailes, astronaut
 June 27 – Douglas Unger, novelist
 June 30
 David Garrison, actor
 Patrick Pinney, actor

July
 July 1 
 David Arkenstone, musician and composer
 Robert Baer, author
 Leon "Ndugu" Chancler, drummer (died 2018)
 July 2 – Linda M. Godwin, scientist
 July 4 – Paul Rogat Loeb, author and activist
 July 5 – Hillbilly Jim, professional wrestler and radio host
 July 6
 Grant Goodeve, voice actor
 Jennifer Savidge, actress
 July 7 – Cheryl Gould, journalist
 July 8 
 Jerry Hertaus, politician and businessman from Minnesota
 Marianne Williamson, spiritual teacher, author and lecturer
 July 9 – John Tesh, composer, musician, and television host (Entertainment Tonight)
 July 12 – Philip Taylor Kramer, rock musician (died 1995)
 July 14
 Bob Casale, rock keyboardist (Devo) (died 2014)
 Franklin Graham, evangelist, son of Billy Graham
 Ken Hutcherson, American football player (died 2013)
 Stan Shaw, actor
 July 15 
 Terry O'Quinn, actor
 Marky Ramone, musician
 Johnny Thunders, guitarist and singer, co-founder of the New York Dolls, inspiration for punk and glam metal; also founder of The Heartbreakers (died 1991)
 July 16 
 Stewart Copeland, drummer and songwriter
 Richard Egielski, author and illustrator
 July 17 
 David Hasselhoff, actor, singer, producer and businessman
 Nicolette Larson, pop singer (died 1997)
 Billy Sprague, Christian musician
 July 20 – Renny Cushing, former Democratic leader of the New Hampshire House of Representatives (died 2022)
 July 21 – John Barrasso, U.S. Senator from Wyoming from 2007
 July 31
 Chris Ahrens, ice hockey player
 Michael Wolff, jazz pianist

August
 August 2 – Arthur "Art" James, former MLB baseball outfielder
 August 8 – Robin Quivers, African American radio personality (The Howard Stern Show)
 August 9 – Vicki Morgan, model (died 1983)
 August 10 – Daniel Hugh Kelly, actor
 August 11 – Bob Mothersbaugh, rock composer and guitarist (Devo)
 August 12 – Daniel Biles, associate justice of the Kansas Supreme Court
 August 13
 Gary Gibbs, football coach
 Herb Ritts, photographer (died 2002)
 August 16 – Gianna Rolandi, soprano (died 2021)
 August 18 – Patrick Swayze, actor (died 2009)
 August 24 
 Bob Corker, U.S. Senator from Tennessee from 2007 to 2019
 Carlo Curley,  organist and educator (died 2012)
 Mike Shanahan, American football player and coach
 August 25 – Charles M. Rice, virologist, Nobel Prize recipient
 August 26 – Michael Jeter, actor (died 2003)
 August 27
 Paul Reubens, actor, writer and comedian (Pee-Wee Herman)
 Roger Stone, lobbyist  
 August 31 – Lee Hyla, composer

September
 September 1 – Michael Massee, actor (died 2016)
 September 19 – George Warrington, president of Amtrak (1998–2002); executive director of NJ Transit (2002–07) (died 2007)  
 September 22 – Bob Goodlatte, U.S. Congressman from Virginia  
 September 23 – Jim Morrison, baseball player 
 September 24
 Joseph Patrick Kennedy II, politician
 Mark Sandman, rock musician, artist (died 1999) 
 September 25
 bell hooks, author, academic, and activist (died 2021)
 Jimmy Garvin, professional wrestler  
 Christopher Reeve, actor and activist (died 2004)
 September 29 – Max Sandlin, politician

October
 October 2 – Robin Riker, actress and author
 October 13 
 Michael R. Clifford, astronaut and army officer (died 2021)
 Mundo Earwood, country music singer, songwriter (died 2014)
 Beverly Johnson, African-American model, actress and businesswoman 
 October 14
 Harry Anderson, actor, comedian, and magician (died 2018)
 Rick Aviles, actor (died 1995)
 October 16 – Ron Taylor, actor (died 2002)
 October 18
 Andy Johnson, American football player (died 2018) 
 Chuck Lorre, sitcom creator
 October 21 – Patti Davis, actress and author
 October 22 
 Julie Dash, director, producer and screenwriter
 Jeff Goldblum, actor, a spouse of actress Geena Davis
 Greg Hawkes, musician
 October 24
 Jane Fancher, author and illustrator
 Mark Gray, country singer, songwriter (died 2016)
 Peter Smagorinsky, theorist and educator
 Reggie Walton, baseball player
 David Weber, science-fiction and fantasy author

November
 November 2 – Laurence D. Fink, business investor
 November 3 – Jim Cummings, voice actor
 November 5
 Brian Muehl, puppeteer
 Bill Walton, basketball player and sportscaster
 November 7 – David Petraeus, U.S. Army general
 November 8 – Jerry Remy, baseball player and broadcaster (died 2021)
 November 9 – Sherrod Brown, U.S. Senator from Ohio from 2007
 November 12 – Ronald Burkle, entrepreneur
 November 14 
 Bill Farmer, voice actor, comedian and impressionist
 Maggie Roswell, actress
 November 19 – Stephen Soldz, psychoanalyst and activist
 November 27 – Buddy Rose, professional wrestler (died 2009)  
 November 30 
 Keith Giffen, comic book writer, artist 
 Mandy Patinkin, American actor and singer

December
 December 1 – Ellen McLain, singer and voice actress
 December 2
Peter Kingsbery, singer, songwriter (Cock Robin)  
Rob Mounsey, keyboard player, composer and producer
Carol Shea-Porter, social worker, academic and politician
 December 6
Chuck Baker, baseball player
Joe Harris, American football player
Craig Newmark, computer programmer and entrepreneur; founded Craigslist
Jeff Schneider, baseball player
David L. Spector, biologist and academic
 December 7 – Susan Collins, U.S. Senator from Maine from 1997
 December 13 – Junkyard Dog, pro wrestler (d. 1998)
 December 20 – Ray Bumatai, musician, singer, recording artist and actor (died 2005)

Date unknown
Michael Nakoneczny, American artist

Deaths
 January 8 – Antonia Maury, astronomer (born 1866)
 January 18 – Curly Howard, vaudevillian (The Three Stooges) (born 1903)
 January 24 – Duke York, film actor (born 1908)
 January 25 – Polly Moran, actress (born 1883)
 January 26 – André Cheron, film actor (born 1880 in France)
 January 27 – Fannie Ward, actress (born 1872)
 January 28 –  Thomas Hicks, marathon runner (born 1876)
 February 7
 Philip G. Epstein, screenwriter (born 1909)
 Pete Henry, American football player and coach (born 1897)
 February 14
 Molly Malone, silent film actress (born 1888)
 John Sheehan, actor (born 1885)
 February 21 – Francis Xavier Ford, Roman Catholic bishop, missionary, servant of God and reverend (born 1892)
 March 1 – Gregory La Cava, film director (born 1892)
 March 2 – Ole E. Benson, politician (born 1866)
 March 12 – Hugh Herbert, actor and comedian (born 1887)
 March 22 – Uncle Dave Macon, vaudeville banjoist (born 1870)
 March 31
 Bo McMillin, American football player and coach (born 1895)
 Roland West, film director (born 1885)
 Wallace H. White, Jr., U.S. Senator from Maine (born 1877)
 May 9 – Canada Lee, African American actor (born 1907)
 May 10 – Clark L. Hull, psychologist (born 1884)
 May 21 – John Garfield, screen actor (born 1913)
 May 27 – Bertha Fowler, educator (born 1866)
 June 1
 John Dewey, philosopher (born 1859)
 Malcolm St. Clair, filmmaker (born 1897)
 June 6 – Thomas Walsh, Roman Catholic archbishop and reverend (born 1873)
 June 10 – Frances Theodora Parsons, naturalist (born 1861)
 June 13 – Emma Eames, soprano (born 1865)
 June 17 – Jack Parsons, rocket engineer and occultist (born 1914)
 June 27 – Elmo Lincoln, film actor (born 1889)
 July 1 – A. S. W. Rosenbach, book collector (born 1876)
 July 4 – Walter Long, film character actor (born 1879)
 July 20 – Isabelle LaMal, film actress (born 1886)
 July 22 – Harry Carter, silent film actor (born 1879)
 July 26 – Edward Ellis, actor (born 1870)
 August 1 – Andrew Higgins, boatbuilder and industrialist (born 1886)
 August 2 
 Charles K. French, film actor, director and screenwriter (born 1860)
 J. Farrell MacDonald, film character actor and director (born 1875)
 August 11 – Riccardo Martin, tenor (born 1874)
 August 16 – Lydia Field Emmet, painter (born 1866)
 August 30 – Arky Vaughan, baseball player (Pittsburgh Pirates) (born 1912)
 September 5 – Fernando Luis García, Puerto Rican marine, killed in action (born 1929)
 September 9 – Jonas H. Ingram, admiral (born 1886)
 September 23 – Ray Mala, Nastive American film actor (born 1906)
 September 26 – George Santayana, philosopher, died in Italy (born 1863 in Spain)
 September 30 – Waldorf Astor, 2nd Viscount Astor, businessman and politician (born 1879)
 October 11 – Jack Conway, film producer and director (born 1887)
 October 17 – Julia Dean, actress (born 1878)
 October 19 – Edward S. Curtis, photographer, ethnologist and film director (born 1868)
 October 23 – Susan Peters, actress (born 1921)
 October 24 – Frederick Jacobi, composer (born 1891)
 October 26 
 Myrtle McAteer, tennis player (born 1878)
 Hattie McDaniel, African American actress (born 1893)
 November 1 – Dixie Lee, singer (born 1911)
 November 6 – George H. Reed, African-American screen actor (born 1866)
 November 8 – Hugh Prosser, film actor (born 1900)
 November 10 – John Roche, actor (born 1893)
 November 21 – William D. Upshaw, temperance leader (born 1866)
 December 4 – Karen Horney, psychoanalyst (born 1885 in Germany)
 December 12 – Billy Cook, spree killer, executed (born 1928)
 December 15 – Emmanuel Boleslaus Ledvina, Roman Catholic prelate, bishop and reverend (born 1868)
 December 19 – Pehr G. Holmes, politician (born 1881 in Sweden)
 December 29 – Fletcher Henderson, African American jazz bandleader and pianist (born 1897)
 December 30 – Luke McNamee, admiral and Governor of Guam (born 1871)

See also
 List of American films of 1952
 Timeline of United States history (1950–1969)

References

External links
 

 
1950s in the United States
United States
United States
Years of the 20th century in the United States